The Tango Returns to Paris (Spanish:El tango vuelve a París) is a 1948 Argentine musical comedy film, written and directed by Manuel Romero. It was premiered on January 16, 1948.

The film's plot is about a doctor who arrives to Paris that will become a tango singer.

Cast
  Alberto Castillo as Alberto Reinald 
 Elvira Ríos as Lupe Torres 
 Severo Fernández as Medizábal 
 Lilian Valmar as Azucena 
 Julio Renato as Don Fermín  
 Aníbal Troilo as Pichuco  
 Fernando Lamas as Flores 
 Juan José Porta as Don Jorge Reinald  
 Antonio Provitilo as Dupont  
 Carlos Rosingana as Renaud  
 Roberto Blanco as Fernández  
 Betty Corté as La Muñeca 
 Alfredo Jordan as El Amigo  
 Carlos Cambria as El Comisario

References

External links

1948 films
1948 musical comedy films
Argentine musical comedy films
1940s Spanish-language films
Argentine black-and-white films
Films directed by Manuel Romero
1940s Argentine films